Qisas is the concept of retribution in Islamic law.

Qisas or qasas may also refer to:

Islam 
 Al-Qaṣaṣ, the 28th chapter of the Qu'ran
 Qisas Al-Anbiya, any of various collections of stories adapted from the Quran and other Islamic literature

Fiction 
 Qisas al-Nabiyeen, a book by Abul Hasan Ali Hasani Nadwi
 Qiṣaṣ qaṣīrah, a book by Abdallah Abbas Al-Iryani
 "Qisa Ghareiba", a story by Hazi Helo
 Qisas Khatt al-Istiwa'I, a book by Zakariyau Oseni
 Qiṣaṭ Ukhrá: Qiṣaṣ, a book by Taissier Khalaf

Other 
 Ahsan al-Qisas, part of the Selections from the Writings of the Báb, from the founder of Baha'i faith
 Qisa-shazada, the Arabic name for a story of two Christian martyrs